Crocus thomasii  is a species of flowering plant in the genus Crocus of the family Iridaceae. It is a cormous perennial native from southern Italy to Croatia.

References

thomasii